Saint Mildrith, also Mildthryth, Mildryth and Mildred, (born c. 660, died after 732), was a 7th and 8th-century Anglo-Saxon abbess of the Abbey at Minster-in-Thanet, Kent. She was declared a saint after her death, and later her remains were moved to Canterbury.

Life and family
Mildrith was the daughter of King Merewalh of Magonsaete, an area similar to the present day Herefordshire, a sub-kingdom of Mercia. Her mother was Domne Eafe (also sometimes named as Saint Eormenburga), herself a great-granddaughter of Æthelberht of Kent, and as such appearing in the so-called Kentish Royal Legend.

Her sisters Milburga of Much Wenlock and Mildgyth were also considered saints, and Mildrith, along with her extended family, features in the Kentish Royal Legend, also known as the "Mildrith Legend". In the 11th century, Goscelin wrote a hagiography of Mildrith, the Vita Mildrethae. Another work, the Nova Legenda Anglie of 1516, gives an extensive account of her life.

Mildrith's maternal family had close ties to the Merovingian rulers of Gaul, and Mildrith is said to have been educated at the prestigious Merovingian royal abbey of Chelles. She entered the abbey of Minster-in-Thanet, which her mother had established, and became abbess there by 694. A number of dedications to Mildrith exist in the Pas-de-Calais, including at Millam, thereby suggesting that ties to Gaul were maintained. Mildrith died at Minster-in-Thanet some time after 732 and was buried there in the Abbey Church of St Mary.

Relic remains
Mildrith's successor as Abbess, Eadburg (also styled Edburga of Minster-in-Thanet, a correspondent of Saint Boniface), built a new Abbey church, also at Minster in Thanet, dedicated to saints Peter and Paul, and translated Mildrith's remains there not later than 748. The shrine within the Abbey became a popular place of local pilgrimage, with Mildrith becoming a much-loved local patron saint.

The last Abbess of Minster in Thanet was Leofruna, who was captured by Danes in 1011. The abbey was abandoned and the church downgraded to a parish church. Mildrith's remains, despite fierce local opposition, were translated to St Augustine's Abbey, Canterbury in 1030, an event commemorated on 18 May. St. Mildred's church, within the town walls at Canterbury, dates back to this time.

Some of her relics were given, in the 11th century, to a church at Deventer, Netherlands. In 1881 the feast day of St. Mildred was officially reinstated by Pope Leo XIII. In 1882, following a refounding of a Benedictine monastery at Minster in Thanet, the nuns petitioned the Archbishop of Utrecht, who granted their return to Thanet. In 1937 Minster Abbey was bought by nuns of the Benedictine order, and in 1953 a relic of St. Mildred was brought there.

Family tree
The family tree of this part of the royal family of Kent in the 7th century is derived from the later Old English and Latin accounts. Eadbold became king in 616 A.D, succeeded by Eorcantberht in 640 A.D. (possibly co-ruling with his brother Eormenred, Mildrith's grandfather). Ecgberht came to the throne in 664 and died in 673 A.D.

References

Literature 
 Brooks, Beda: The world of Saint Mildred, c. 660–730. A study of an Anglo-Saxon nun in the golden age of the English Church, Bath 1996, .
 Rollason, David W.: The Mildrith legend. A study in early Medieval hagiography in England. Leicester 1982, .

Sources
 Love, R. C., "Mildrith, St" in Michael Lapidge et al., The Blackwell Encyclopedia of Anglo-Saxon England. Oxford: Blackwell, 1999. 
 Rollason, D. W., The Mildrith Legend: a study in early medieval hagiography in England (series "Studies in the Early History of Britain", Leicester University Press) 1982. (This includes the full Latin text of the 13th century Bodley 285 Text and the Vita Mildrethae of Goscelin of Canterbury.)
 Introduction and primary texts of three Anglo-Saxon Lives of St Mildreth, dated between 725 and 974, in Old English: Þá hálgan (aka The Kentish Royal Legend); Caligula 'Life of St Mildrith' (with translation); The Lambeth Palace text of Þá hálgan.
O.S.B., "Saint Mildred and her Kinsfolk", Virgin Saints of the Benedictine Order, Catholic Truth Society, London, 1903
Nova Legenda Anglie (first published in 1516. This ed. 1901.) The entry for De Sancta Mildreda is in Vol. II p. 193–197

External links 
 

Mercian saints
Kentish saints
Anglo-Saxon royalty
Anglo-Saxon abbesses
7th-century births
8th-century deaths
8th-century Christian saints
People from Minster-in-Thanet
Female saints of medieval England
7th-century English nuns
8th-century English nuns
House of Icel
Medieval English saints
English Roman Catholic saints
English Roman Catholics
History of Catholicism in England